The Minolta Vectis S-series comprises two APS system models of film SLR cameras made by Minolta, the flagship model Vectis S-1 and the Vectis S-100. The cameras feature a compact design, owing to the use of mirrors instead of prisms in the viewfinder.

Only one early DSLR camera body, the Minolta Dimâge RD 3000, also used the V-lens mount.

The Vectis brand was also shared with a number of small APS rangefinder cameras with fixed lenses, including the waterproof Vectis Weathermatic and Vectis GX series. The model numbers of these cameras don't include the S prefix used for the SLR series.

Vectis V mount

The Vectis V mount lenses used by the above models are not compatible with any other lens mount, including Minolta's 35mm A-mount and SR-mount systems. Aperture and focus are controlled electronically by the camera; the image circle of the lenses only illuminates the APS formats, and the flange focal distance of V mount is only 36.00 mm. 

There are thus only limited options to adapt V mount lenses to other cameras. A small hand-production run of an adapter was made for Vectis-to-Sony NEX. As of 2020, the Chinese-made "MonsterAdapter LA-VE1" allows using V mount lenses on Sony E mount cameras, offering aperture control, focal length detection for both EXIF and IBIS, and manual-only focus. It is sold sporadically on online marketplaces, priced at US$199. A new version, the "MonsterAdapter LA-VE2", appeared as a crowd funded item on Indiegogo and offers the benefits of the LA-VE1 plus the added bonus of auto-focus.  This new adaptor was offered in September of 2022.  It is fully compatible with newer E mount Sony cameras and offers limited compatibility with older E mount cameras.

Lenses

List of V-mount interchangeable lenses:
Prime lenses
V 17 mm 3.5 RD (#2764)
V 50 mm 3.5 Macro (1:2) (#2305)
V 400 mm 8 Reflex (#2307)
Zooms
V 22–80 mm 4-5.6 (#2301)
V 25–150 mm 4.5-6.3 (#2309)
V 28–56 mm 4-5.6 (#2303)
V 56–170 mm 4.5-5.6 (#2304)
V 80–240 mm 4.5-5.6 Apo (#2302)

The 17 mm lens is specified to work with the RD 3000 only, but can be used on the S-1 and S-100 as well. 
The 400 mm reflex lens as well as the 25–150 mm and 56–170 mm zooms may not perform to their full potential on the RD 3000, however.

At least the 400 mm lens illuminates the full frame format, albeit with soft vignette typical for refractive designs.

References

 Information about the Vectis S-1 and S-100
 Models and manuals for Minolta Vectis series cameras

Vectis S series